Irupathiyonnaam Noottaandu is a 2019 Indian Malayalam-language action romance film written and directed by Arun Gopy and produced by Tomichan Mulakuppadam through the company Mulakuppadam Films. The film stars Pranav Mohanlal and Rachel David. Gokul Suresh appears in a cameo role. Gopi Sundar composed the music and Abinandhan Ramanujam was the cinematographer. Peter Hein choreographed the action for the film and Vivek Harshan was the film editor.

The film's principal photography took place between July and December 2018 in Goa, Bali, Kerala, and Hyderabad. Irupathiyonnaam Noottaandu was released in India and Gulf Cooperation Council territories on 25 January 2019 by Mulakuppadam Release.

Plot 

The story revolves around the life of Appu, a boy born and brought up in Goa. The movie starts with the New Year's Eve, wherein Macaroni and his girlfriend are celebrating . Much to his annoyance, there comes the entry of Abusi and his henchmen who demand the money borrowed by Baba as he was the one who assured the guarantee for payment. Macroni flees and is eventually caught by Abusi's men, who takes him to their place. After some time, Baba appears at their house, and he is also caught by them. This leads to the entry of Appu, Baba's only son, who is an expert surfer and jet ski rider. Appu assures for the payment and settles a small amount of money, and bails out Macroni and Baba. On the eve of the Russian new year, Appu is confronted by Zaya as she was creating a scene there since she lost her phone. Appu agrees to drop her to her homestay but is eventually forced to take her to his homestay as she can't remember the location of her homestay since she was drunk.

Eventually, Appu and Zaya become good friends, and they do a variety of activities in goa, such as visiting tourist places, jet skiing, and going to casinos. Slowly Appu starts developing feelings for Zaya. He then decides to convey his feelings to her, but when he reciprocates his feelings, she gets freaked out and runs away. When he goes to her the next day, he finds out that she has gone away from Goa to her hometown in Kerala. After a few days, Baba approaches him and suggests that he go to Kerala to know whether she had feelings towards him. He then reaches Kerala with Macroni. When he goes to her Palatial house's entrance, he finds it locked and  finds out that all of them have gone for an engagement ceremony. Feeling sad (as he thinks it was Zaya's engagement), he decides to make it to the church and eventually finds out that it was Zaya's sisters engagement but is shocked to know that Zaya was a nun. This leads to the formation of various mysteries in his mind (due to her carefree nature back in Goa), and when he confronts Zaya at her convent, she reveals that she became a nun because of various consequences as she was sexually exploited by her uncle (on a Christmas Eve when she was young) who worked for the police and this fact was not known to any of her family members as she feared to tell them fearing more harm from her uncle. She becomes a nun because she found out that her uncle didn't show any sort of respect towards any other women but nuns. Appu understands Zaya's plight and assures her that he will always be there for her and learns that Zaya loves him and she very much aspires to  become a free-spirited young girl.

On the eve of Zaya's sister's pre-wedding function Appu is employed as a waiter there since the owner of the lodge in which he was staying was organising the wedding and he has not paid the rent of the lodge, so he decides to take up work as a waiter to clear his dues and in order to meet and converse  with Zaya. But as he converses with Zaya, he is confronted by her uncle, who beats him up, and he is thrown out of the function along with the other workers, and he is caught by police due to Zaya's uncles' initiation. He is freed the next day because of the lodge owner's initiation. He then rushes to the wedding, beats up Zaya's uncle and his men and walks out  holding Zaya's hand. They are chased by police, and they resort to taking up a shelter for a day in a priest's convent lodging. Over there, they receive the help of Francis, who assures them to take them to the railway station without striking their presence in the eyes of the police. They are eventually brought to the station, and they board the train. However, they are shocked to find Zaya's uncle and his men in the train who are in a hunt for them. as they run away from them to a different compartment, they are surprised to find Baba, who tells Appu that if he wants to live with her, he must stop running away and face them with courage. Taking account of Baba's words, Appu decides to fight, and this leads to a very serious fight between Appu, Zaya's uncle and his men. However, Appu overpowers them but is unfortunately caught by the police in the next station and is taken for questioning. When they go for questioning, they come to know that Zaya running away with Appu has resulted in huge media attention as it was a subject of communalism in media's language (as it was framed so).

After the initiation of a bishop, they decide that Appu should go away alone without Zaya. When Appu asks whether she has any last words for him, she  hugs him tightly. She is then interrupted by her father, and this leads to Zaya mustering courage to reveal what she was subjected to when she was young and how she had to live with it. This leads to the sudden understanding of her parents, but her uncle, who wants to defend his stand, walks up to Zaya to slap her, who is then stopped by her mother, and she slaps him. Eventually, he is given a legal punishment, and Appu happily moves to Goa with Zaya. Appu clears away the dues which he had with Abusi after selling Macroni's land in Kerala and lives happily with Zaya. The film ends on a happy note, saying that we must ensure healthy family relationships and must also be warned that women and young girls are subjected to rape within their very own household.

Cast 

 Pranav Mohanlal as Appu
 Rachel David as Zaya
 Abhishek Raveendran as Michael Rony / Macaroni 
 Manoj K. Jayan as Baba
 Dharmajan Bolgatty as Godwin
 Bijukuttan as Godwin's friend
 Kalabhavan Shajohn as Abusi
 Harish Raj as DYSP Xavier
 Siddique as Father
 Innocent as Bishop
 Nelson Sooranad as Home-stay Cook
 Shaju K. S. as Cherappayi
 G. Suresh Kumar as Zaya's Father
 Tini Tom as ACP Majeed Ali
  Sreedhanya as Prabha
 Parvathi T. as Mother Superior
 Antony Perumbavoor as Antony Bavoor
 Vinod Kedamangalam
 Megha Thomas as Elizabeth
 Nimisha Anna Thomas as Sarah Koshy
 Jayakrishnan  as Sebastian Paul
 Dini Daniel as Xavier's wife
 Gokul Suresh as Francis (cameo appearance)
 Parvathy Arun as Merin

Production

Development 
The film was announced by Arun Gopy on 3 March 2018 via social media. Announcing the film, Arun wrote the untitled film would be written and directed by himself and would be produced by Mulakuppadam Films with Pranav Mohanlal in the lead role. It is his second directorial and consecutive collaboration with producer Tomichan Mulakuppadam after Ramaleela (2017), and his debut writing task. The title of the film was revealed through a poster released on 9 July 2018 and a puja ceremony for the film was held on the same day at Anchumana Devi Temple in Edappally. The film carries the tagline: "not a don story".

Arun envisioned the story during the 2015–2016 period. The plot idea was based on an anecdote during a Goan trip with his friend in 2015. He transferred his experience to an imaginary character and formed a story. Arun thought of casting a newcomer in the principal role then. After Ramaleela, Tomichan Mulakuppadam was interested in producing a film with Pranav in the lead role and asked Arun about any story that can be used. Tomichan was looking for a story which can cast either Mohanlal or Pranav in the lead role. Arun briefed the story of Irupathiyonnaam Noottaandu meant for Pranav, which he agreed to act. It was commissioned, and Arun himself developed the screenplay. The proposed Mohanlal film was scheduled in their next lineup.

Filming 
Principal photography commenced on 27 July 2018 in Kanjirappilly, Kottayam district, with Abhinandan Ramanujam serving as the director of photography. Filming also took place on-location in Ernakulam and Pala in the following month. In September, the film was shifted to Vagamon for the second schedule. Pranav's surfing scenes were shot at the Bali island in Indonesia in the following month. Filming also took place at Goa and Hyderabad locations. In November, set photos taken from the film showed Pranav performing stunt scenes on a train, choreographed by Peter Hein. The Cochin Harbour Terminus and its near-by area was a location for filming held in November last week. The shooting was completed on 1 December 2018. The film was shot for two days at a set built at Varkala Beach for a late-night New Year bash scene before wrapping. Beside Hein, Supreme Sundar also worked as action choreographer in the film. Raju Sundaram and Sathish Krishnan were the dance choreographers.

Soundtrack
The film features original background score and songs composed by Gopi Sundar and penned by B. K. Harinarayanan. The song "Aaraaro Ardhramayi", sung by Niranj Suresh and Kavya Ajit, was released on 12 January 2019. The songs were recorded at Sunsa Digital Workstation in Chennai and Kochi.

Release
Irupathiyonnaam Noottaandu was released in India and Gulf Cooperation Council territories on 25 January 2019 by Mulakuppadam Release. The full version of the film was digitally released on YouTube on 21 October 2019.

Promotion 
The first-look poster featuring Pranav Mohanlal was released through social medias on 10 December 2018. On 13 December 2018, Dulquer Salmaan launched the first teaser of the film on Facebook. On 29 December 2018, a poster revealing newcomer Rachel David was launched online introducing her as the heroine of the film. In early January 2019, Gokul Suresh officially revealed that he will be seen in a small part in the film and shared a poster on Facebook. On 22 January 2019, the official trailer of the film was launched via Twitter by Suriya.

Response

Critical reception 
The film received mostly negative reviews upon release. Nowrunning rated 2.5 stars out of 5, saying "coupled with flawed execution, the consistent slipshod approach sullies 'Irupathiyonnam Noottandu'", adding "the visual effects in the climax are pretty far away from satisfying the sensibilities", but praised the "powerful and rich visuals" of Abinandhan Ramanujam. Regarding the lead, "Pranav moves along comfortably in the adventurous sequences than lending a confident touch to the character". Sify rated 2 stars out of 5, saying the movie "suffers from ordinary writing and unbelievably shoddy packaging". S.R. Praveen of The Hindu described the script as "incoherent and lacking novelty or surprises", and the visual effects as "below par" adding"this movie specialises in single shade characters who lack any depth". Regarding acting, Pranav "is expected to emote often, throwing him a challenge which he finds tough to live up to".

References

External links
 
 

2019 films
2010s Malayalam-language films
2010s action adventure films
2019 action thriller films
Indian romantic action films
Indian action adventure films
Films set in Goa
Films shot in Kochi
Films shot in Thiruvananthapuram
2010s romantic action films